Robert E. Carpenter Jr. (born July 13, 1963) is an American former professional ice hockey center who was recently head coach of Kunlun Red Star of the Kontinental Hockey League. Prior to that he played in the National Hockey League (NHL) for 18 seasons from 1981–82 until 1998–99. In his NHL career that spanned 18 years, Carpenter played 1,178 games, scoring 320 goals and 408 assists for 728 points. He has the distinction of being the second American-born hockey player to be selected in the first round of the NHL Entry Draft (Mike Ramsey was the first), and the first player to play in the NHL directly from high school after being drafted. Carpenter was born in Beverly, Massachusetts, but grew up in Peabody, Massachusetts.

Playing career
Carpenter was selected third overall in the 1981 NHL Entry Draft out of St. John's Preparatory School in Danvers, Massachusetts.  In the February 23, 1981 issue of Sports Illustrated, Carpenter was featured in a cover story that chronicled his potential.    During his first tour with the Capitals, he would have his best statistical season during 1984-85 when he scored 53 goals and 42 assists and was the first US-born player to score 50 goals in a season. He was invited to play in the 1985 NHL All-Star game and he also participated in the 1984 and 1987 Canada Cup tournaments as a member of Team USA.

Primarily due to his clashes with head coach Bryan Murray, the Capitals traded Carpenter to the New York Rangers in the deal that sent Mike Ridley and Kelly Miller to Washington during the middle of the 1986–87 NHL season. Later in the season, he would be dealt again, to the Los Angeles Kings in the trade that sent Marcel Dionne to the Rangers. He finished the 1986–87 season with the United States team at the 1987 Ice Hockey World Championship tournament in Moscow after the Kings were eliminated in the first round of the 1987 Stanley Cup playoffs. Carpenter represented the US nationals for the final time in the 1987 Canada Cup.

Carpenter was traded to the Boston Bruins during the 1988–89 NHL season, and a year later he would help guide the Bruins to the NHL Stanley Cup Finals. By this stage of his career, Carpenter was contributing more as a defensive-minded center than the high-scoring superstar whom he was once projected to be.

Carpenter signed with the Capitals in 1992 and spent one season in his second tour with the team that originally drafted him. In 1993, he signed with the New Jersey Devils, where he would play for the final six seasons of his NHL career. It was during his time with the Devils that he would help the team win their first Stanley Cup in the lockout-shortened 1994–95 NHL season. After retirement, Carpenter stayed on as an assistant coach, winning two more cups with New Jersey in 2000 and 2003.

Awards and achievements
Played in NHL All-Star Game (1985)
Scored an assist on a goal by Ryan Walter after only 12 seconds  of his debut game against the Buffalo Sabres on October 7, 1981. This is still the quickest assist by a player in his first game.
Stanley Cup champion: 1995 (player); 2000, 2003 (coach assistant)

Career statistics

Regular season and playoffs

International

Post-retirement
He is currently the Director of Program Development for the Valley Jr. Warriors of the Eastern Junior Hockey League.  His work for the Toronto Maple Leafs since the fall of 2009 consists of being a development coach for players from the time they were drafted into the organization until they turn professional, scouting US College and QMJHL hockey, and steering free agents Toronto's way.

He lives with his wife and has three children, all of whom participate in sports. His oldest child, his daughter Alex Carpenter, is captain of the Shenzhen KRS Vanke Rays and won Olympic silver in 2014 with the United States women's national ice hockey team, in addition to five IIHF Women's World Championship gold medals. His son Robert III "Bobo" had a 2 year entry level contract with the New York Islanders as of 2019 and played two seasons for their AHL affiliate.  He scored his first AHL goal in the third period of his first game. He now plays in the ECHL.

In 2016, Carpenter ran the Boston Marathon in three hours and 47 minutes, having taken up training for the event after leaving a job with the Toronto Maple Leafs. In 2017 he ran the event a second time, pushing Denna Laing, women's hockey player who was paralyzed in the 2016 Outdoor Women's Classic game, in a special racing wheelchair; they finished with a time of 4:32:30.

See also

List of NHL players with 1000 games played

References

External links

Profile at hockeydraftcentral.com

1963 births
Living people
American men's ice hockey centers
Boston Bruins players
Ice hockey coaches from Massachusetts
Los Angeles Kings players
National Hockey League All-Stars
National Hockey League first-round draft picks
New Jersey Devils coaches
New Jersey Devils players
New York Rangers players
Sportspeople from Beverly, Massachusetts
People from Peabody, Massachusetts
Stanley Cup champions
Sportspeople from Essex County, Massachusetts
Toronto Maple Leafs scouts
United States Hockey Hall of Fame inductees
Washington Capitals draft picks
Washington Capitals players
Ice hockey players from Massachusetts